Events in the year 2010 in Monaco.

Incumbents 
 Monarch: Albert II
 State Minister: Jean-Paul Proust (1 May 2005 – 29 March 2010) and Michel Roger (29 March 2010 – 16 December 2015)

Events 
 26 March – Jean-Paul Proust resigned as Minister of State of Monaco due to grave illness.
 16 May – Mark Webber won the 2010 Monaco Grand Prix.

Deaths 
 8 April – Former Minister of State Proust died in a hospital in Marseille. He was succeeded in the post by Michel Roger.

See also 

 2010 in Europe
 City states

References 

 
Years of the 21st century in Monaco
2010s in Monaco
Monaco
Monaco